Cobb is a census designated place (CDP) in Lake County, California, United States. The population was 1,778 at the 2010 census, up from 1,638 at the 2000 census.

History
The area is named for John Cobb, who settled in Cobb Valley in 1853. The first post office at Cobb opened in 1911.

2015 fire
Many of the community's homes were destroyed in September 2015 by the Valley Fire.

Geography

The ZIP code is 95426. Lake County borders Napa County to the southeast, Sonoma County to the southwest, Mendocino County to the west and northwest, Glenn County to the northeast and Colusa and Yolo Counties to the east.

The Geysers Geothermal Field is located just south of Cobb.

Climate
This region experiences warm (but not hot) and dry summers, with no average monthly temperatures above .  According to the Köppen Climate Classification system, Cobb has a warm-summer Mediterranean climate, abbreviated "Csb" on climate maps.

Demographics

2010
The 2010 United States Census reported that Cobb had a population of 1,778. The racial makeup of Cobb was 1,625 (91.4%) White, 14 (0.8%) African American, 31 (1.7%) Native American, 13 (0.7%) Asian, 1 (0.1%) Pacific Islander, 26 (1.5%) from other races, and 68 (3.8%) from two or more races. Hispanic or Latino of any race were 113 persons (6.4%).

The Census reported that 1,778 people (100% of the population) lived in households, 0 (0%) lived in non-institutionalized group quarters, and 0 (0%) were institutionalized.

There were 789 households, out of which 179 (22.7%) had children under the age of 18 living in them, 422 (53.5%) were opposite-sex married couples living together, 65 (8.2%) had a female householder with no husband present, 39 (4.9%) had a male householder with no wife present.  There were 46 (5.8%) unmarried opposite-sex partnerships, and 10 (1.3%) same-sex married couples or partnerships. 208 households (26.4%) were made up of individuals, and 70 (8.9%) had someone living alone who was 65 years of age or older. The average household size was 2.25.  There were 526 families (66.7% of all households); the average family size was 2.68.

The population was spread out, with 305 people (17.2%) under the age of 18, 119 people (6.7%) aged 18 to 24, 337 people (19.0%) aged 25 to 44, 751 people (42.2%) aged 45 to 64, and 266 people (15.0%) who were 65 years of age or older.  The median age was 50.1 years. For every 100 females, there were 105.1 males.  For every 100 females age 18 and over, there were 106.9 males.

The homeowner vacancy rate was 3.4%; the rental vacancy rate was 8.9%.  1,369 people (77.0% of the population) lived in owner-occupied housing units and 409 people (23.0%) lived in rental housing units.

2000
As of the census of 2000, there were 1,638 people, 637 households, and 456 families residing in the CDP. The racial makeup of the CDP was 93.22% White, 0.61% Black or African American, 1.53% Native American, 0.73% Asian, 0.06% Pacific Islander, 0.31% from other races, and 3.54% from two or more races.  4.58% of the population were Hispanic or Latino of any race.

There were 637 households, out of which 32.8% had children under the age of 18 living with them, 58.1% were married couples living together, 8.6% had a female householder with no husband present, and 28.3% were non-families. 20.9% of all households were made up of individuals, and 4.6% had someone living alone who was 65 years of age or older.  The average household size was 2.56 and the average family size was 2.95.

In the CDP, the population was spread out, with 26.7% under the age of 18, 5.4% from 18 to 24, 26.2% from 25 to 44, 30.0% from 45 to 64, and 11.8% who were 65 years of age or older.  The median age was 41 years. For every 100 females, there were 103.0 males.  For every 100 females age 18 and over, there were 101.5 males.

The median income for a household in the CDP was $53,182, and the median income for a family was $65,938. Males had a median income of $60,473 versus $28,125 for females. The per capita income for the CDP was $22,779.  About 8.2% of families and 14.3% of the population were below the poverty line, including 21.8% of those under age 18 and none of those age 65 or over.

Education
On November 20, 2009, Cobb School achieved a rare and coveted California State Award, "Cobb Mountain Elementary wins Governor’s Challenge Competition Award". Cobb Mountain Elementary has an Academic Performance Index score of 881, the county's highest API score for a school, according to state records. That most recent test was a 30-point improvement over the previous year. The award brings a $100k first prize for school for enrichment.

Recreation
Cobb Mountain was a popular recreation area from the 1870s to 1970s.  It is currently home to a handful of spiritual retreat centers, including The Mountain of Attention Meditation sanctuary of Adidam, and The Heart Consciousness Church Harbin Hot Springs. In 1971 Maharishi Mahesh Yogi (January 12, 1918 – February 5, 2008) introduced Transcendental Meditation (also known as TM) at a former popular resort called Hobergs. He renamed it The Capital of the Age of Enlightenment of Northern California and later The Maharishi Vedic School. Hobergs reopened in 2014 as Hoberg's Resort & Spa.

Cobb has two golf courses of 9 holes each: Cobb Mountain Golf and Adams Springs. The local Boggs Mountain Demonstration State Forest has almost  for mountain biking, hunting, and hiking.
There are several Inns, resorts, and Bed and Breakfast establishments, as well as a small shopping center with a grocery store, gas station, pizza restaurant, and coffee house.

In popular culture
Highway 175 was mentioned as the next-to-last highway ridden in the classic book Zen and the Art of Motorcycle Maintenance by Robert Pirsig.

Government

Cobb is split with two Lake County Supervisors, Rob Brown District Two and Jim Comstock District One.

References

External links
  Details on Cobb, California
  Cobb, California Travel Resource
 Lake County Web Site

Census-designated places in Lake County, California
Census-designated places in California